Marchwood Military Port (MMP) or Marchwood Sea Mounting Centre (SMC) is a military port located in Marchwood, Southampton on the south coast of the UK, and the base of 17 Port & Maritime Regiment Royal Logistic Corps. The port was built in 1943 to aid in the D-Day assault on Normandy in 1944 and has since been used to support the Falklands War.

Marchwood is also the base-port for several Royal Fleet Auxiliary ships.

History and facilities

The port was built in 1943 with the intent that it should be used to aid the Normandy landings in 1944 by shipping men and equipment across to the beaches, the port was also used to support the occupying forces following the success of the landings. At this time the port was relatively small, with just one jetty.

The port now consists of three main jetties.

It has two sophisticated class 100 ro-ro link span ramps facility capable of handling vessels with various ramp configurations. There are two 32 tonne cranes with container handling ability. The two berths are maintained to + (low water).

It is named for the mulberry harbours used on the French coast for the post D-Day logistics.

Gunwharf Jetty (berths 5 and 6) is a subsidiary jetty of  that is used to berth military landing craft and smaller vessels.

There is also a small ship maintenance facility with a boatlift rated at 225 tonnes.

The waters are dredged to  so the whole complex can accept the majority of ships likely to be used by the Ministry of Defence.  Dolphins at the seaward end makes it easier for longer ships to use. The Directorate of Land Service Ammunition (DLSA) has granted the port a licence to handle ammunition/explosives on the main jetty. The port has a limited capacity to handle containerised cargo within the 289-acre estate.

The port again found use during the Falklands War, when it was employed to transport men and equipment to the Falkland Islands.  The port aided Operation Corporate as a launching point for the Royal Fleet Auxiliaries Round Table class landing ships, armoured vehicles were also transported from Marchwood to the Europic Ferry via Mexeflote and then on to the Falklands.  The port also became a massive assembly area for cargo and armoured vehicles which were subsequently forwarded to Southampton for transportation to the Falklands as required.  At the conclusion of the war the port was used to receive 80 war dead, who were kept in the cargo shed, before being processed and returned to their families for funerals.

After the Falklands it became clear to the UK government that the base in Marchwood had been highly important in the war, and so the government spent £18 million on upgrading and improving the base, which only had a single jetty at the time.  The Quartermaster General, appointed after the war, commented on the previous makeshift style of the port, saying that when he was assigned the job he was told to "get the Army some decent boots and sort out Marchwood", to which Major Robin Barton replied "At Marchwood, General, we are not too fussed about the boots".

Nonetheless, the port was expanded considerably, with administration blocks being put in, as well as the Falklands deep water jetty, and training facilities. The water front is left clear for cargo and loading. The expansion of the port has become subject of a short documentary, meant for civil engineers.

In 2000 proposals were made to implement a separate, civilian, container port and access roads in close proximity to Marchwood. In a Parliamentary question, a Member of Parliament asked the Government whether the Ministry of Defence could accept such building works. The response was "yes," provided the Armed Forces' security and other requirements were taken into account, including in the planning process. The expansion has since been implemented.

The base also contains a small standard gauge diesel powered railway network that transports freight and occasionally passengers around the site. It is connected to the main network of Railways in the United Kingdom, allowing freight trains to access the port and is regularly used to transport military vehicles and materiel to and from the port.

The port is now used largely by the Royal Fleet Auxiliary, as a base for their ships, including their amphibious ships, but it is also still employed for military cargo and personnel movement.

The site is named McMullen Barracks and the operating unit is 17 Port and Maritime Regiment, Royal Logistic Corps.

In October 2010, it was reported that the port is to be sold to a private operator, but that no firm decision had been made regarding the future use of the port by the military. In August 2020, it was announced that the port would be converted to civilian use, with the Ministry of Defence retaining use of an element of the port.

Based units 
The following based units and ships are based at the port:

British Army
17 Port and Maritime Regiment, Royal Logistic Corps

Royal Navy
Fort Rosalie-class replenishment ships:
RFA Fort Rosalie (A385)
RFA Fort Austin (A386)
Fort Victoria-class replenishment oiler:
RFA Fort Victoria (A387)
Tide-class fast fleet tankers:
RFA Tidespring (A136)
RFA Tiderace (A137)
RFA Tidesurge (A138)
RFA Tideforce (A139)

References

External links

Marchwood Military Port at www.ports.org.uk
BBC article on Marchwood Military Port

Ports and harbours of Hampshire
Military ports
Royal Logistic Corps
Royal Fleet Auxiliary